The 1990 MLB Japan All-Star Series was the third edition of the championship, a best-of-eight series between the All-Star teams from Major League Baseball (MLB) and Nippon Professional Baseball (NPB), then-called All-Japan.

NPB won the series by 4–3–1 but Ken Griffey Jr. (MLB player) was named MVP.

Results 
Championship

Rosters

MLB All-Stars roster

NPB All-Stars (All-Japan) roster

References

MLB Japan All-Star Series
1990 in Japanese sport
1990 in baseball